Forest Hills is a borough in Allegheny County, Pennsylvania, United States. The population was 6,429 at the 2020 census, as compared to 6,831 in 2000, and 7,335 in 1990.

The borough was named after Forest Hills, Queens.

Geography
Forest Hills is located at  (40.421918, -79.851872).

Surrounding neighborhoods
Forest Hills has five borders, including Wilkinsburg and Churchill to the north, Wilkins Township to the east, Chalfant to the southeast, North Braddock to the south-southeast, and Braddock Hills from the south to the northwest.  These municipalities, along with East Pittsburgh, Edgewood, Rankin, Swissvale, and Turtle Creek, make up the Woodland Hills School District.

Government and Politics

Extra-borough Elected Representatives

Landmarks
Forest Hills is located along the Route 30 portion of the Lincoln Highway, which, along with Greensburg Pike, serves as a main artery of the borough.

Until 2015, near the eastern border with Chalfant, there once stood an historic, five-million-volt Van de Graaff generator and particle accelerator known as the Westinghouse Atom Smasher. The Atom Smasher operated from 1937 to 1958, and because of many important discoveries that were made using the device—it was designated an official historic landmark in 2010. However, the apparatus was torn down in 2015, when the property that had served as the primary campus of the Westinghouse Research Laboratories from 1916 to 1956 was being prepared for redevelopment.

Forest Hills is known for its many recreational and family oriented activities.  Forest Hills boasts several parks: Forest Hills main Park and Arboretum, Ryan Glenn, Koch, Avenue L Park and Arboretum, and Bright Park.  The summer attraction is its pool, which offers residents and their guests a place to keep cool.  Several of the facilities offer affordable rentals throughout the year.
There are several leagues available to the residents and their families including: baseball, soccer, basketball, swimming, synchronized swimming and tennis.  Adults have several options as well including yoga, aerobics, pool classes, lap swimming, scrap-booking, and various other activities.
Seniors can enjoy a lunch and activities at the senior center.

Demographics

As of the census of 2010, there were 6,518 people, 3,099 households, and 1,807 families residing in the borough. The population density was 4,073.8 people per square mile (1,572.9/km²). There were 3,304 housing units at an average density of 2,065.0 per square mile (797.3/km²). The racial makeup of the borough was 87.68% White, 9.14% African American, 0.09% Native American, 1.18% Asian, 0.02% Pacific Islander, 0.40% from other races, and 1.49% from two or more races. Hispanic or Latino of any race were 1.32% of the population.

There were 3,099 households, out of which 21.1% had children under the age of 18 living with them, 45.4% were married couples living together, 9.5% had a female householder with no husband present, and 41.7% were non-families. 35.8% of all households were made up of individuals, and 31.0% had someone living alone who was 65 years of age or older. The average household size was 2.10 and the average family size was 2.74.

In the borough the population was spread out, with 18.7% under the age of 20, 4.3% from 20 to 24, 24.1% from 25 to 44, 33.2% from 45 to 64, and 19.7% who were 65 years of age or older. The median age was 47.5 years. For every 100 females, there were 87.3 males. For every 100 females age 18 and over, there were 82.6 males.

In 2000, the median income for a household in the borough was $44,922, and the median income for a family was $56,199. Males had a median income of $42,903 versus $31,103 for females. The per capita income for the borough was $26,505. About 4.7% of families and 5.6% of the population were below the poverty line, including 8.2% of those under age 18 and 2.7% of those age 65 or over.

References

External links
Borough of Forest Hills official website
Local / Neighborhoods East (Pittsburgh Post-Gazette)

Populated places established in 1919
Pittsburgh metropolitan area
Boroughs in Allegheny County, Pennsylvania
1919 establishments in Pennsylvania